Drosera humilis is a perennial tuberous species in the genus Drosera that is endemic to Western Australia. It has 3 to 5 semi-erect stems that are 3 to 15 cm long with carnivorous leaves arranged in whorls around the stems. It is native to a region from the Moore River north to Kalbarri and east to Ajana and Wongan Hills. It grows in winter-wet sandy soils in heathland. It flowers from June to September.

It was first formally described by Jules Émile Planchon in 1848. Twice the taxon was reorganized and assigned to a taxonomic rank under D. stolonifera, once in 1906 by Ludwig Diels and again in 1982 by Neville Graeme Marchant.

See also 
List of Drosera species

References

External links 

Carnivorous plants of Australia
Caryophyllales of Australia
Eudicots of Western Australia
Plants described in 1848
humilis